Phrynobatrachus batesii is a species of frog in the family Phrynobatrachidae.
It is found in Cameroon, Gabon, Ghana, Nigeria, possibly Equatorial Guinea, and possibly Togo.
Its natural habitats are subtropical or tropical moist lowland forest, freshwater marshes, intermittent freshwater marshes, and heavily degraded former forest.
It is threatened by habitat loss.

References

batesii
Amphibians described in 1906
Taxonomy articles created by Polbot